Arrell is a surname. Notable people with the surname include:

Dave Arrell (1913–1990), Australian rules footballer
James Arrell (1888–1955), American rugby union player

See also
Arrell Gibson (1921–1987), American historian and author
Harrell (name)